Barwala Assembly constituency is one of the 90 Vidhan Sabha constituencies of Haryana state in northern India.

Subedar Prabhu Singh from Bhiwani was the first MLA from Barwala in the election held in the year 1967. He defeated Sh Amar Singh by 6000 votes .

It is part of Hisar Lok Sabha constituency.

Members of the Legislative Assembly

Election results 
Subedar Prabhu Singh from Bhiwani was the first MLA from Barwala in the election held in 1967. He defeated Sh Amar Singh by 6000 votes.

2014 
Ved Narang of Indian National Lok Dal won the 2014 Haryana Legislative Assembly election on 19 October 2014.

See also 

 Haryana Legislative Assembly
 Elections in Haryana
 Elections in India
 Lok Sabha
 Rajya Sabha
 Election Commission of India

References

External links 
 Chief Election Officer, Haryana

Assembly constituencies of Haryana
Hisar district